Gyp Casino (born as Jesper Sporre on 7 May 1961) is a Swedish rock drummer. He played in Warheads (under his real name) and was the original drummer for Hanoi Rocks. He was replaced by Razzle in 1982. Although he does not appear on the cover for Self Destruction Blues, Casino does play on the record.

In 1995, Casino reunited with former Hanoi Rocks bandmate Andy McCoy for a tour with his then band Shooting Gallery.

Discography

Hanoi Rocks 
 Bangkok Shocks, Saigon Shakes, Hanoi Rocks (1981)
 Oriental Beat (1982)
 Self Destruction Blues (1982)

References 

1961 births
Hanoi Rocks members
Living people
Swedish heavy metal drummers